Filomarino is an Italian surname. Notable people with the surname include:

 Ascanio Filomarino (1583–1666), Italian Roman Catholic cardinal
 Ferdinando Cito Filomarino (born 1986), Italian film director and screenwriter
 Gennaro Filomarino (1591–1650), Roman Catholic prelate
 Paolo Filomarino (1562–1623), Roman Catholic prelate

Italian-language surnames